Caladenia ferruginea, commonly known as the rusty spider orchid, is a species of orchid endemic to the south-west of Western Australia. It has a single, hairy leaf and up to four rust-coloured flowers with a white, red-tipped labellum.

Description
Flowering occurs from September to October.

Taxonomy and naming
Caladenia ferruginea was first described by William Nicholls in 1947 and the description was published in The Victorian Naturalist. The specific epithet (ferruginea) is a Latin word meaning "rust-coloured" referring to the colour of the flowers of this orchid.

Distribution and habitat
Rusty spider orchid is found between Perth and Albany in the Jarrah Forest, Swan Coastal Plain and Warren biogeographic regions where grows in a variety of habitats ranging from well-drained soil in woodlands to swamps which are flooded in winter.

Conservation
Caladenia ferruginea  is classified as "not threatened" by the Western Australian Government Department of Parks and Wildlife.

References

ferruginea
Orchids of Western Australia
Endemic orchids of Australia
Plants described in 1947
Endemic flora of Western Australia